Trillo may refer to:

 Trillo, Italian for Trill (music), a musical ornament
 In 17th century Italy "trillo" denotes the so-called 'Monteverdi trill' or 'goat's trill', a tremolo-like repetition of a single pitch, the term "gruppo" being used for the modern trill or shake.
 Trillo, a threshing-board used in some Spanish-speaking countries
Trillo (Guadalajara), town in Spain with nearby Trillo Nuclear Power Plant

People
St. Trillo, 6th century Breton missionary to Wales after whom Llandrillo (Denbighshire) and Llandrillo yn Rhos are named
John Trillo ( 1915 –1992), bishop of the Church of England
Carlos Trillo (1943 – 2011), Argentine comic book writer
Manny Trillo (b. 1950), former Major League Baseball second baseman
Federico Trillo, former Minister of Defence of Spain
Dennis Trillo (b. 1981), Filipino actor and star of My Husband's Lover